Bamman is a surname. Notable people with the surname include: 

Gerry Bamman (born 1941), American actor and playwright
Henry A. Bamman (19182000), American author and academic